Jean-Claude Martinez (born 30 July 1945, in Sète, Hérault) is a French politician and Member of the European Parliament for the south-west of France. He was a member and a vice-president of the Front National, and was among the Non-Inscrits until the 2007 formation of the Identity, Tradition, Sovereignty Group in the European Parliament. He sits on its Committee on Agriculture and Rural Development.

Martinez is also a substitute for the Committee on Budgets, a member of the delegation to the Euro-Mediterranean Parliamentary Assembly, and a substitute for the delegation for relations with the countries of Central America.

Martinez was part of the "TSM" current inside the FN (Tout sauf Mégret, Anybody But Mégret) during the 1990s crisis, along with Samuel Maréchal, Marine Le Pen, Roger Holeindre, the Catholic current represented by Bernard Antony and Bruno Gollnisch, and Martine Lehideux.

Career
 Postgraduate teaching qualification in law (1975)
 Course director, ÉNA (National School of Administration), Morocco (1976–1980)
 Professor at the faculty of law of Panthéon-Assas University since 1983
 Deputy Chairman of the National Front
 Member of a regional council (1992–2004)
 Former member of Montpellier Municipal Council
 Member of the National Assembly (1986–1988)
 Member of the European Parliament (1989-2009)

Bibliography 
 Mohammed VI, le Roi stabilisateur, Ed. J-C Godefroy, 2015
 Demain 2021, with Jean-Pierre Thiollet, Ed. Godefroy de Bouillon, 2004
 La faucille ou le McDo, Lettres du Monde, 2003
 La piste américaine, Lettres du Monde, 2002
 L'Europe folle, Presses bretonnes, 1996
 La fraude fiscale, "Que sais-je", Presses universitaires de France, 1990
 L'impôt sur le revenu en question, Litec, 1989
 Les cent premiers jours de Jean-Marie Le Pen à l'Élysée, Lettre du Monde, 1988
 Lettre ouverte aux contribuables, Albin Michel, 1985

References

External links
 European Parliament biography
 Declaration of financial interests (in French; PDF file)

1945 births
Living people
People from Sète
French people of Spanish descent
Politicians from Occitania (administrative region)
National Rally (France) politicians
Rally for the Republic politicians
Deputies of the 8th National Assembly of the French Fifth Republic
National Rally (France) MEPs
MEPs for South-West France 2004–2009
MEPs for France 1999–2004
Academic staff of Paris 2 Panthéon-Assas University